Sonia Rai (born 13 November 1980)  born in Himachal Pradesh and brought up in Kangra. She is an Indian shooter, the first Indian pistol shooter to win a World Cup medal in WC Resende, Brazil in 2006. She also won the Silver Medal in 2010 Asian Games in Guangzhou, China.

References

1980 births
Living people
Indian female sport shooters
ISSF pistol shooters
Shooters at the 2006 Asian Games
Shooters at the 2010 Asian Games
Asian Games medalists in shooting
Sportswomen from Himachal Pradesh
People from Kangra, Himachal Pradesh
21st-century Indian women
21st-century Indian people
Sport shooters from Himachal Pradesh
Asian Games silver medalists for India
Medalists at the 2006 Asian Games
Medalists at the 2010 Asian Games